Tripterygion melanurum is a species of fish in the family Tripterygiidae, the threefin blennies. It is widespread in the Mediterranean Sea, where it occurs around the Balearic Islands and off the coasts of southern Sardinia, Algeria, Tunisia, Israel, Lebanon, Greece, Cyprus, and southern Turkey.

References

External links
 

melanurum
Fish of Europe
Fish of Africa
Fish of Western Asia
Fish of the Mediterranean Sea
Fish described in 1850